WKPO (105.9 FM, "KPO-FM") is a commercial radio station licensed to serve Soldiers Grove, Wisconsin, United States.  The station is owned by Robinson Corporation.

WKPO broadcasts an adult hits format.

History
This station received its original construction permit from the Federal Communications Commission on February 23, 2005.  The new station was assigned the call sign WKAH by the FCC on February 20, 2008.  WKAH received its license to cover from the FCC on March 14, 2008.  The station was assigned call sign WKPO by the FCC on September 3, 2008.

References

External links

KPO
Adult hits radio stations in the United States
Crawford County, Wisconsin
Radio stations established in 2005